Middle child syndrome is the belief that middle children are excluded, ignored or even outright neglected because of their birth order. This alleged effect is supposed to occur because the first child is more prone to receiving privileges and responsibilities (by virtue of being the oldest), while the youngest in the family is more likely to receive indulgences. The second child (or middle child) no longer has their status as the baby and is left with no clear role in the family, or a feeling of being "left out". 

There is often a negative connotation surrounding the term "middle child syndrome." It is debated whether the family dynamic imposes this negative attitude or if middle children develop it themselves, or if it exists at all. The APA Dictionary of psychology states that "the notion that [birth order] has strong and consistent effects on psychological outcomes is not supported".

Theories 
Alfred Adler (1870–1937), was an Austrian psychiatrist and worked closely with Sigmund Freud and founded the school of individual psychology. Specializing the inferiority complex, Adler was a pioneer in psychology as the first to theorize that birth order influences personality. He also believed that birth order had a lasting impact on an individual's methods of coping with stress and problem solving skills in adulthood. Adler's theory revolves around the nuclear family structure, with both parents present in the children's lives, an average space between siblings, and excluding extenuating circumstances such as the birth of twins, a tragedy in the family, or the occurrence of step-siblings. Adlerian researchers take a more modern approach of studying birth order today, in which they move away from studying the phenomenon of birth order traits in favor of studying the effects of birth order on Style of Life.

According to Adler's birth order theory,  a child may have several personality characteristics, depending on their birth order. For example: 

 The oldest child is more authoritarian and feels all-powerful due to the high expectations often set by the parents.
 The youngest child is treated like a spoiled baby and can never rise above the other siblings.
 The middle child is even-tempered but has trouble fitting in due to being sandwiched between the younger and older siblings.

Some negative traits that Middle Born children are stereotyped with: Rebellious, Not as family oriented, Non perfectionist. Some positive traits middle children are stereotyped with include: Great Negotiators, Fighters for justice, Driven by status, More open to risks, Open minded, Persuasive, Empathetic. However, there are no scientific findings that these traits are universal among middle children.

Research 
A study on the differences between the perceived IQ of middle-born children and their siblings was conducted in 1988. Through the data they collected, researchers found that parents tended to have a more favorable impression of their first-born's intellect than their younger siblings. It was found that when testing the IQ of siblings of comparable ages, their IQ scores tended to be within a few points of each other. The study concluded that although siblings tended to have a similar IQ due to having a shared environment, the way they were treated due to their perceived intelligence was mismatched. 

In 1998, researchers conducted a survey to test the theory that birth order had an influence on the personality of an individual and the strength of their bond with their parents. They found that middle children were the least likely to say they would turn to their parents when faced with a dire and stressful situation. It was also noted that middle children were less likely to nominate their mother as the person they felt most close to compared to the first-borns and last-borns.

In 2016, research was done on birth order and its effect on the idealistic self-representation among undergraduate Engineering students. There were 320 participants and researchers found that middle-born children were less likely to be family-oriented than their siblings. Reviewing the study it is stated the first-born children rate higher in being protective than their younger siblings, in a similar manner the middle children scored the highest for affection and getting along but lower for companionship and identification. These results indicate that there are differences in characteristics brought on by birth order. Middle children were also the most likely to develop maladaptive perfectionism, which is an inclination towards following instructions up to the finest details.

An analysis on birth order and parental sibling involvement in sex education was conducted in 2018. The survey had over 15,000 participants. The results showed that middle-born women were slightly less likely than women who are the youngest in their family to talk to their parents about the matter, with results of 30.9 percent to 29.4 percent respectively. A similar story was told on the men’s side as 17.9 percent of middleborn men found it easy to talk to their parents about sex compared to the 21.4 percent of last-born men.

A study conducted by Jeannie S. Kidwell, explored the self-esteem of middleborns compared to first and last born children. The key aspects of this study included variables such as the number of children, spacing in age, and gender. Kidwell wanted to study Middleborns compared to firstborns and lastborns in relation to Self-esteem. This is because she believed self esteem is an important scope of one's identity and is related to many other areas of competence, achievement, and relationships during a child's development. The study found that self-esteem decreases as the number of siblings increases but is only noteworthy when the siblings are spaced at an average interval of two years. The study suggests that this is because “there is less time to develop and solidify the uniqueness inherent in being firstborn and lastborn when there is only one year between siblings. With this compact spacing, all three birth positions become less distinct, clouding the behavioral and perceptual differences between them.” This uniqueness is referred to as the “lack of uniqueness” phenomenon. Which is defined as achieving status, affection, and recognition among siblings and feeling special in the eyes of one's parents. Which Kidwell was testing to see if this was more difficult for the middleborn and is reflected in overall self-assessment. Kidwell also determined through this study that being an only male among female siblings creates a much higher form of self-esteem, helping to balance the lack of status which occurs when one is caught "in the middle.”

References 

Human development
Psychological theories
Sibling